The VI Grand Prix de Marseille was a Formula One motor race held on 18 May 1947 at Prado in Marseille. The race was held over 69 laps and was won by Eugène Chaboud in a Talbot-Lago MC. Enrico Platé was second in a Maserati 4CL and Henri Louveau third in a Delage 3L. Raymond Sommer was on pole position, and set joint fastest lap with Luigi Villoresi; both retired their Maseratis with mechanical problems.

Classification

References

Marseille
Marseille
Marseille